Ronnie DePasco (March 19, 1943May 24, 2003) was an American Democratic politician who served in the Missouri House of Representatives from 1977 until 1993 and the Missouri Senate from 1993 until his death in 2003.

DePasco attended Maple Woods Junior College and Rockhurst College.  He died in 2003, following a battle with lung cancer.

References

1943 births
2003 deaths
20th-century American politicians
Democratic Party members of the Missouri House of Representatives
Democratic Party Missouri state senators